Passmore may refer to
Passmore (surname)

Passmore, Milton Keynes, England

See also 
Passmores Academy, a school in Harlow, Essex, England
Pasmore (disambiguation)